Wilfried Huber (born 15 November 1970 in Bruneck, South Tyrol) is an Italian luger and coach who competed from 1985 to 2010. Together with Kurt Brugger, he won the men's doubles event at the 1994 Winter Olympics in Lillehammer. He competed in both doubles and singles, but enjoyed his greatest success in doubles in partnership with Brugger. He made his debut in the Luge World Cup in 1986-87 season. He also took two medals at the World Junior Championships in Olang in 1988, a silver and a bronze. He competed in six Winter Olympics, in 1988, 1992, 1994, 1998, 2002 and 2006: he was aiming to compete at the 2010 Winter Olympics, however he was not selected by the Italian team's head coach Walter Plaikner, and retired at the end of the season.

Huber also won seven medals at the FIL World Luge Championships, including two silvers (Men's doubles: 1990, Mixed team: 1995) and five bronzes (Men's singles: 1993, Men's doubles: 1993, 1995; Mixed team: 1996, 1997). At the European Luge Championships, he won five medals with one gold (Mixed team: 1994), three silvers (Men's doubles: 1992, 1994; Mixed team: 1998) and one bronze (Mixed team: 1996).

In the Luge World Cup, Huber's finished second overall four times in the men's doubles championship (1989–90, 1992-3, 1994-5, 1997-8) and third overall once in the men's singles championship (1996-7).

After retiring from competition, he joined the coaching staff of the Italian national luge team.

He also had siblings who were involved in bobsleigh and luge. Günther won gold in the two-man bobsleigh event (shared with Canada) at the 1998 Winter Olympics in Nagano. Norbert won two Winter Olympic medals in men's doubles luge in the 1990s: in 1994 he took the silver behind his brother. Arnold won the men's singles world championships at Winterberg in 1991.

References
1988 luge men's doubles results
1992 luge men's doubles results
1998 luge men's doubles results
2002 luge men's singles results
2006 luge men's singles results
DatabaseOlympics.com profile on Huber.
http://www.fil-luge.org/News-Detail.155.0.html?&tx_ttnews[tt_news]=10669&tx_ttnews[backPid]=45&cHash=dd3f4e331c (FIL-Luge.org 7 July 2009 article on Huber's qualifying efforts for the 2010 Winter Olympics in Vancouver. - accessed 10 July 2009.)
FIL-Luge profile
Fuzilogik Sports - Winter Olympic results - Men's luge
Hickoksports.com results on Olympic champions in luge and skeleton.
Hickok sports information on World champions in luge and skeleton.
List of European luge champions 
List of men's doubles luge World Cup champions since 1978.
List of men's singles luge World Cup champions since 1978.

External links
 
 
 

1970 births
Living people
Italian lugers
Italian male lugers
Italian sports coaches
Olympic gold medalists for Italy
Olympic lugers of Italy
Olympic medalists in luge
Lugers at the 1988 Winter Olympics
Lugers at the 1992 Winter Olympics
Lugers at the 1994 Winter Olympics
Lugers at the 1998 Winter Olympics
Lugers at the 2002 Winter Olympics
Lugers at the 2006 Winter Olympics
Medalists at the 1994 Winter Olympics
Sportspeople from Bruneck
Lugers of Centro Sportivo Carabinieri
Germanophone Italian people